WBEN (930 kHz) is a commercial AM radio station licensed to Buffalo, New York, featuring a talk radio format. Owned by Audacy, Inc., the station serves Western New York, the Niagara Falls region, and parts of Southern Ontario. WBEN's studios are located in Amherst, while the transmitter site is in Grand Island. In addition to a standard analog transmission, WBEN is relayed over WKSE's HD3 digital subchannel, and is available online via Audacy.

WBEN is an affiliate of ABC News Radio, and WKBW-TV provides weather forecasts. The station airs overflow sports programming from WGR, including the NFL on Westwood One and Buffalo Sabres hockey games that are played on the same day as Buffalo Bills football contests. Syndicated programming includes, Our American Stories with Lee Habeeb, and Coast to Coast AM with George Noory

History
1920s
WBEN has traditionally traced its history to September 8, 1930, the date when it made its first broadcast using the WBEN call sign.  However, Federal Communications Commission (FCC) records list the station's first license date as September 22, 1922, tracing WBEN's origin to an earlier license, with the sequentially assigned call letters of WMAK, that was issued to Norton Laboratories in Lockport, New York. The station initially used the facility built by the Norton Laboratories organization from Boston as part of an experiment to send amplitude modulated voice transmissions between Niagara Falls, New York, and Cambridge, Massachusetts.

WMAK was a charter member of the Columbia Broadcasting System (CBS) radio network, being one of the 16 stations that aired the first CBS network program on September 18, 1927. In 1928, WMAK joined with General Electric's WGY in Schenectady to demonstrate television technology. A mechanical scan system with only 30 lines of vertical resolution, it was crude compared to later electronic standards such as the 525-line NTSC analog system and subsequent 1080-line high definition digital television. But the effort was historic because GE's experimental facility was the first American television station with a regular broadcast schedule, as well as the forerunner of the current Capital District CBS-TV affiliate WRGB. The comedy duo of Stoopnagle and Budd began their careers at WMAK in 1930.

When WMAK was launched in 1922, it initially operated on the standard "entertainment" wavelength of 360 meters (833 kHz). In mid-1924 the station was reassigned to 1100 kHz and at the end of the year was shifted again, to 1130 kHz. In late 1927 the transmitter site was changed to Tonawanda, followed a few months later to Shawnee Road in Martinsville. In mid-1927 the station moved to 550 kHz.

Effective November 11, 1928, WMAK was reassigned to 900 kHz, with 750 watts of power, now with a timeshare partner, WFBL in Syracuse, as a result of the Federal Radio Commission's (FRC) General Order 40, which implemented a major realignment of American AM radio. (At this time, WMAK's previous frequency of 550 kHz was assigned to WGR). WMAK was unhappy with this new assignment because the reduced hours limited its ability to carry CBS network programming. WFBL was also unhappy, even though it was also issued an unusual second authorization for unlimited use of 1490 kHz to test "synchronized" transmissions. In practice, WFBL preferred the 900 kHz assignment and only broadcast on 1490 kHz during times when, under the timesharing agreement, 900 kHz was in use by WMAK.

Eventually, a five-way legal battle broke out over control of the 900 kHz assignment. WMAK and WFBL filed applications for full-time use of the frequency, while two other existing stations, WEBR in Buffalo and WBNY in New York City, applied for half-time assignments. A fifth application, made with support from local businesses, came from the Buffalo Evening News, which filed a request to build a new full-time station. Although it had never operated a radio station, the News had extensive experience supplying a news service to local stations, beginning in November 1920 when it provided election returns for broadcast over an amateur station operated by Charles C. Klinck, Jr. The News also had a contract to supply news for use by the Buffalo Broadcasting Company stations, however, a dispute led to the station group canceling the contract in September 1929.

The five competing station applications were evaluated at a Federal Radio Commission hearing on December 18, 1929. The FRC issued its ruling two days later, denying the WMAK, WFBL, WEBR, and WBNY applications while ordering WFBL to transmit exclusively on 1490 kHz. It also granted the Buffalo Evening News' request to build a new 1,000-watt station on 900 kHz with unlimited hours. In early 1929 WMAK had been acquired by the Buffalo Broadcasting Company, based at Buffalo's Rand Building, which also controlled WGR and WKBW in Buffalo and WKEN in nearby Kenmore. The FRC saw this as pertinent to its decision, stating "There existed in Buffalo, New York, a virtual monopoly of broadcasting facilities controlled by the Buffalo Broadcasting Corporation by reason of which Buffalo and the surrounding community were given radio broadcasting service... of an unstable and unsatisfactory nature", therefore "the greatest benefit to the greatest number would result from granting the application of the Buffalo Evening News". A Construction Permit to build the new station, with a sequentially assigned provisional call sign of WRDA, was issued on January 23, 1930, specifying a transmitter site in Orchard Park and studios in Buffalo.

1930s
Both WMAK and WFBL appealed this ruling. WFBL complained that 1490 kHz was an "undesirable" assignment, and the FRC eventually agreed for the station to use 1360 kHz instead. Following plaintiff arguments, but prior to the appeals court making a ruling, the Buffalo Evening News and the Buffalo Broadcasting Company devised a settlement, and agreed that instead of building a completely new station, the newspaper would purchase WMAK and upgrade its existing transmitter site. The assignment of WMAK's license to the Buffalo Evening News was made on June 25, 1930, and WMAK's call letters were changed to WBEN. The original construction permit for a (never built) new station was modified to specify that it was now an upgrade to the existing Martinsville transmitter site.  At the same time, WMAK's call sign and intellectual property were transferred to the former WKEN in Kenmore, where it would operate until its deletion in 1932. Following the repeal of the Davis Amendment in 1948, WMAK's vacated frequency assignment was licensed to a new station in Kenmore, now WUFO in Amherst.

WBEN remained off the air while the upgrades were being made until it made its debut broadcast on September 8. A new studio complex was built at the Statler-Hilton Hotel in downtown Buffalo, chosen primarily for access to the live orchestra there, which served WBEN, its sister FM station, and a television station opened in the spring of 1948, for more than 25 years.

In 1934, WBEN continued the station's tradition of innovation, launching the ultra-shortwave experimental station W8XH on the Apex radio band, as the first station of its kind to broadcast a regular schedule. In December 1938, WBEN began an experimental facsimile service, transmitting overnight newspaper extracts printed with special receivers in subscribing homes."Real Newspaper Delivered Through Ether", Buffalo Evening News, December 18, 1938, page 18. In April 1939, the facsimile service was transferred to an "experimental facsimile broadcasting station", W8XA, which employed much of the equipment originally used by W8XH. The facsimile service was ended in December 1940.

1940s

In 1941, WBEN moved to its current frequency of 930 kHz as a result of the North American Regional Broadcasting Agreement (NARBA) reassignments. The station also relocated its transmitter to Grand Island at this time, increasing full-time power to its current 5,000 watts. The Grand Island transmitter and two towers are still in use today.

Buffalo, in general, and WBEN in particular, was an incubator of national radio and television talent. In the early 1940s, WBEN's morning host was comedian and future national late-night television star Jack Paar (he left the station when drafted into the military in 1943 during World War II and opted not to return to Buffalo after the war). Paar's place was taken by Clint Buehlman, who was recruited from competing station WGR. Buehlman remained for 34 years until retiring in 1977.

WBEN was also the station where longtime national commercial spokesman Ed Reimers launched his career, In 1946, WBEN was one of the first radio stations in the United States to launch an FM radio station, which originally was located at 106.5 MHz on the dial. In May 1948, it launched what would become WIVB, the first television station in Buffalo and the second in Upstate New York, following WRGB in Schenectady/Albany. The original WBEN-FM would later move to 102.5, increase its signal strength to 110 kilowatts to become the most powerful FM station in New York State, and eventually become WTSS.

1950s-1960s
As many national network radio programs moved to television, WBEN shifted to a middle-of-the-road format and developed a stable talent to lead the market in ratings. The station's affiliation with CBS brought Arthur Godfrey, "The World Tonight" and other network programming, but the station was primarily live and local. 

In addition to morning host Clint Buehlman, other on-air voices included Al Fox, John Corbett, Ken Phillips, Bill Masters, and John Luther. Sports personalities Van Miller, Stan Barron and Dick Rifenburg shared various duties, including hosting and interview programs, while familiar news voices Jack Ogilvie, Gene Kelley, Lou Douglas, Virgil Booth, and others were heard during this period. Most of these personnel also handled TV duties,  anchoring, announcing the news, weather, and sports, and hosting game shows and other programming at WBEN-TV.

1970s-1980s
When the Federal Communications Commission (FCC) disallowed same market co-ownership of newspapers and broadcast licenses in the early 1970s, the combination of the Buffalo Evening News and WBEN-AM/FM/TV was grandfathered under the new rule. However, the 1974 death of Katherine Butler (longtime owner and publisher of the Evening News) led to the placement of the Evening News's properties in a blind trust (since Katherine Butler left no heirs). This trust company then sold the newspaper. This sale ended the Butler family's ownership of the Evening News. With the loss of the WBEN stations' grandfathered protection, WBEN-TV was sold to newspaper publisher Robert Howard. WBEN-TV's new owner changed channel 4's callsign to WIVB, which stands for "We're IV (4) Buffalo."

By the time of this transition period, WBEN radio's demographics had grown older with its folksy personalities and middle-of-the-road music. With the Butler family no longer owning the newspaper or broadcast properties, WBEN attempted to contemporize the sound during the mid-late 1970s by firing some of its longtime on-air institutions, hiring DJs, and playing Top-40 music. The station went from being known as "WBEN Radio 9-3-0" to "93/WBEN." DJs Jay Fredericks (Fritz Coleman), Chris Tyler, and Charlie Warren joined the station from other markets. Within months the ratings dropped as longtime listeners were angered, yet Top-40 listeners were already entrenched at WKBW and WYSL. Jefferson Kaye, however, had remained successful as the afternoon personality during this period (he succeeded the retiring Clint Buehlman as a morning show host in 1977; Buehlman's retirement was in part prompted by poor reviews for his handling of coverage of the Great Lakes Blizzard of 1977). Buehlman's 34-year run at the station was the longest in WBEN history, a benchmark that would eventually be surpassed by Susan Rose in 2019. Kaye, who had been program director of crosstown rival WKBW, originally came to Buffalo via WBZ in Boston.

As the newspaper and TV station became part of other companies, WBEN-AM and FM were sold to Algonquin Broadcasting, a company led by longtime Buffalo radio executive Laurence "Larry" Levite. Levite assembled a group of managers and talent that returned WBEN to prominence. The line-up was changed, and the format shifted from Full-Service, playing Top-40 to Full-Service with Adult Contemporary music. Jefferson Kaye hosted mornings, while Larry Hunter, Bill Lacey, and Kevin O'Connell and Tom Kelly were heard on middays, and Jack Mindy hosted afternoons. Stan Barron returned to the station, bringing back his "Free-Form Sports" program, and overnights eventually shifted from Dick Rifenburg's music show to Mutual's syndicated Larry King talk show. Bob Wood served as the station's program director. Helicopter traffic reports were added, featuring reporters Dave May and Debbie Stamp, the news department staff was increased - and Levite brought Buffalo Bills broadcasts back to WBEN after a three-year hiatus on WKBW. Van Miller also returned to the Bills' broadcast booth, replacing WKBW announcer Al Meltzer. WBEN, WJYE (with a beautiful music format), and Top 40 outlet WKBW all fought for the top spot during this era, but WBEN had consistently solidified the number one position by 1980. Stan Barron died in 1984 and was succeeded by John Murphy. By the mid-1980s, Kaye departed WBEN's morning show, moving to Philadelphia to become the voice of NFL Films and WPVI-TV. Midday host Bill Lacey, later joined by Kevin Keenan, assumed morning hosting duties.

1990s

The station won numerous regional and statewide awards for its news and public-service efforts. Levite presided over the gradual transition of WBEN from an adult contemporary station to its current news and talk format. The local talk continued, along with the addition of Rush Limbaugh. In 1994, Levite sold the WBEN stations to Kerby Confer's Keymarket Communications organization and retired from the broadcasting business (Levite later moved to print media and took over the monthly Buffalo Spree magazine until his 2017 death). Keymarket later sold the properties to River City Broadcasting, which then merged with Sinclair Broadcast Group. In 1999, Entercom Communications bought WBEN, as well as its competitor WGR and most of Sinclair's other radio stations as Sinclair exited the radio business.

2000-2010
WBEN and WGR had been competing for news/talk/sports stations during the 1990s. In 2000, under common ownership, the stations rearranged personnel. WGR became the market's all-sports station, while WBEN became the market's principal commercial news/talk station.

With sister station WGR's move to sports talk, WBEN solidified its position as the dominant news/talk station. Market veterans John Zach and Susan Rose replaced Bill Lacey (who currently hosts mornings at WHTT) to host "Buffalo's Morning News." Tom Bauerle moved from WGR to host a mid-morning talk show, Limbaugh's program continued, and market veteran Sandy Beach moved from sister station WMJQ to host afternoon talk on the station, while evening hours were filled by syndicated lifestyle hosts Laura Schlessinger and Joy Browne; Browne and Schlessinger were later replaced by The Sean Hannity Show and Jim Bohannon, respectively.

2010-present
From April 5, 2011, to September 26, 2013, Entercom switched its Classic Rock/Triple-A hybrid sister station WLKK to a simulcast of WBEN. Entercom's WLKK was not able to assume the WBEN-FM call letters, since the company had previously released the WBEN-FM call letters. They are in use on a Beasley Broadcast Group station in the Philadelphia area. The "Lake" format continued on WLKK's HD2 digital subchannel.

In July 2013, WBEN made its first major change to its daytime lineup in over a decade. The lineup change moved afternoon drive host Sandy Beach to midday, while midday host Tom Bauerle moved to afternoon drive and expanded his show to four hours. The station's evening news magazine, Buffalo's Evening News (which incorporated a simulcast of the first part of the CBS Evening News), was canceled as part of the expansion, a move made to better coordinate with Arbitron's dayparting practices. (Buffalo's Evening News is expected to return in 2018 after Bauerle's show was cut back to three hours as part of a contract extension.)  After a very brief stint in which David Bellavia filled the shift from 10pm to 1am, the station added The Savage Nation to its syndicated offerings in early 2014.  It was explained at the time that Bellavia's other employer objected to him being on WBEN, so Savage was replacement programming for that slot. Bellavia would however return in late 2016 as Bauerle's co-host and eventually moved to middays with his own show in 2020. Buffalo's Evening News would be revived in 2021 after the death of Rush Limbaugh; the station's parent company also added Dana Loesch on a tape-delay to WBEN and its other talk stations as its intended replacement for Limbaugh.

"Cinema Bob" Stilson, Entercom's creative services director, had a one-hour "Movie Show" that discussed upcoming theatrical releases and aired Fridays during Beach's program from 1997 until Entercom cut Stilson's budget and ended the program in 2017; Stilson later joined WEBR in 2020. Morning host John Zach was permanently laid off at the end of 2016 and later emerged at WECK. Until 2016, WBEN carried news from CBS News Radio, an affiliation the station had held for 76 years. Sandy Beach, whose Beach and Company show had been part of the WBEN lineup since 1997, announced his departure from the station in July 2020.

Today, WBEN competes with country-formatted WYRK for the leadership in total audience in most quarterly ratings surveys.Portions of the above come from the Buffalo Broadcast Pioneers Web site.''

Simulcasts
Between 1946 and 1960, WBEN simulcast on co-owned WBEN-FM, which started on 106.5 MHz.  From 1960 until 1973, the morning show continued to be simulcast. The FM station later moved down the dial to 102.5  The 106.5 frequency was sold, switching its call letters to WADV after the co-owned TV station, WBEN-TV 4, was sold separately to become WIVB in 1977. WBEN-FM later became WMJQ in the 1980s and finally WTSS in the late 1990s.

On April 5, 2011, WBEN began simulcasting on co-owned FM station WLKK at 107.7 MHz, relayed by translator W297AB at 107.3 MHz from Williamsville, New York. On September 26, 2013, WLKK dropped the simulcast.

WBEN was simulcast on the second HD Radio subchannel of WTSS from 2011 to 2015.  It is now heard on the HD3 subchannel of WKSE 98.5 MHz.

See also
List of oldest radio stations
List of radio stations in New York State

References

External links
 
 
The WBEN History Page by Buffalonian Steve Cichon
WBEN jock history (billdulmage.com)
FCC History Cards for WBEN (covering WMAK / WBEN from 1927-1981)

BEN
News and talk radio stations in the United States
Radio stations established in 1922
Audacy, Inc. radio stations
Buffalo Braves broadcasters
1922 establishments in New York (state)
Radio stations licensed before 1923 and still broadcasting